Asplenium ceterach  (syn. Ceterach officinarum) is a fern species commonly known as rustyback.

Description
It is characterised by a short rhizome which gives rise to several green fronds that have a pinnated lamina with trichomes on the abaxial (lower) surface, but not the adaxial (upper) one. These trichomes (hairs) are orange-brown in colour, hence the name "rustyback". The petiole is shorter than the corpus of the leaf.

Taxonomy
Linnaeus was the first to describe rustyback with the binomial Asplenium ceterach in his Species Plantarum of 1753.

A global phylogeny of Asplenium published in 2020 divided the genus into eleven clades, which were given informal names pending further taxonomic study. A. scolopendrium belongs to the "Ceterach subclade" of the "Phyllitis clade". Members of the Phyllitis clade have undivided or pinnatifid leaf blades with a thick, leathery texture, persistent scales on their stalk, and often possess anastomosing veins. Members of the Ceterach subclade have pinnatifid leaves, usually with a thick covering of hairs and/or scales and irregularly anastomosing veins.

Distribution and habitat
This species is found in Western and Central Europe, including the Mediterranean region, in the Arabian Peninsula and in temperate Asia as far east as Tibet. It is associated with fissures in carbonate rocks and also grows on the mortar of stone and brick walls. Can be found growing up to 2700 metres above the sea level, although it prefers mountainous locations, where it is usually found growing in sunny rocky walls and slopes.

Unlike many others, this fern likes growing in full sun, and requires little, if any, humidity.

Traditional uses 
It has been widely used for making infusions as a diuretic.

Desiccation tolerance 
This fern is well known as a resurrection plant due to its ability to withstand desiccation and subsequently recover on rewetting. It has been shown that this is in part due to its high concentrations of phenolic compounds such as chlorogenic acid and caffeic acid which allow it to negate the destructive capacity of the reactive oxygen species generated by the drying process; the concentrations of these phenols decrease during the dehydration process. Enzymes such as peroxidase and polyphenol oxidase have also been shown to be important in allowing this fern to cope with desiccation; the concentrations of these enzymes increase when the fern is subjected to water shortages.

References 

 
 

ceterach
Ferns of Europe
Flora of the Arabian Peninsula
Flora of temperate Asia
Near threatened plants
Plants described in 1753
Taxa named by Carl Linnaeus
Taxobox binomials not recognized by IUCN